Stephen's Tower may refer to:

Hungary:

 

Romania:

Stephen's Tower (Baia Mare)
Stephen's Tower (Piatra Neamţ)